Christopher Britton is a Canadian film, stage, television and voice actor who is probably best known for his work in X-Men: The Animated Series, in which he was the voice of Mister Sinister. More recently, he has voiced the character of Soichiro Yagami in the English dub of the anime series Death Note and its live action counterpart. He also was the narrator on the Dino Crisis II video game created by Capcom in 2000. He has a regular role as Richard Norton in Da Vinci's Inquest/City Hall, and has acted in several different movies from The Day After Tomorrow to Godsend. He has worked on many different plays and theater productions, including two seasons with the Stratford and Shaw Festivals, and has acted throughout Ontario, Vancouver, and the United States.

Background
Born and raised in Toronto, Ontario, Canada, Chris Britton first studied acting as a teenager. For a brief period, an interest in dance led him to become a member of the Judy Jarvis Dance Company, one of the first modern dance companies in Toronto. He graduated from York University with a BFA in theatre. While an undergraduate he was an Associate Fellow of Stong College teaching a course in the life and work of Edward Gordon Craig. Upon graduating he spent two seasons at both the Stratford and Shaw Festivals and worked at regional theaters across Canada. In 1980 Chris started the first Artists Action Network within Amnesty International that worked for the release of imprisoned artists. During the early eighties he studied acting with Uta Hagen in New York City and acted in The Misanthrope directed by Mark Lamos at The Hartford Stage and The Taming of the Shrew at the Astor Place Theater in New York. He returned to Canada to be a member of the Grand Theater Company with Robin Phillips. In the late 80's he landed the role of 'Einstein' in the one actor play and toured Canada, Boston and Louisville, Kentucky. in over 200 performances. In film and television his talents as a character actor can be seen in roles such as the evil Rombout Kemp in Peter Greenaway's Nightwatching, the KKK leader opposite Forest Whitaker in Deacons For Defense, the mad film critic in John Carpenter's Cigarette Burns and in The Final Cut opposite Robin Williams. He has had recurring roles in DaVinci's Inquest, DaVinci's City Hall, Intelligence and Painkiller Jane. His first screenplay, Capital Murder, based on the true story of the lawyer who defended the last two men to be executed in Canada, was awarded a Fellowship in the Praxis Screenwriting Competition. A second screenplay, The Good Men, an action thriller, was also awarded a Fellowship at Praxis.

Chris Britton lives and works in Vancouver with his wife, actress Gwynyth Walsh and frequently returns to Toronto to work and spend time with his daughter Paget.

Filmography

Film

Television

Video games

References

External links

Living people
Canadian male film actors
Canadian male stage actors
Canadian male television actors
Canadian male video game actors
Canadian male voice actors
Male actors from Toronto
20th-century Canadian male actors
21st-century Canadian male actors
Year of birth missing (living people)